Bwaise is a neighborhood within Kampala, Uganda's capital, and largest city. Due to lack of proper urban planning, it has grown into a commercial, industrial and residential township with poor infrastructure. The lack of developed infrastructure and poor service provision has exposed the town dwellings and residents to several challenges including flooding and water borne diseases.

Location

Bwaise is bordered by Kawempe to the north, Kyebando to the east, Mulago to the southeast, Makerere to the south and Kasubi to the southwest. The coordinates of Bwaise are:00 21 00N, 32 33 40E (Latitude:0.3500; Longitude:32.5610).
 
Bwaise is a slum, one of the poorest areas in the city of Kampala. The Uganda Scouts Association operates a school in Bwaise, called Outspan School Bwaise, with assistance from the Northamptonshire Scout Troupe in the United Kingdom.

Fast population growth has resulted in encroachment on the wetlands, the construction of unplanned buildings and poor drainage systems. These developments have made Bwaise prone to flooding.

Points of interest
The following points of interest lie in or near Bwaise:
 The Kampala–Gulu Highway - The highway passes through the middle of the neighborhood in a North-South direction.
 Kawempe Division Headquarters.
 Bwaise Central Market and Kalwere Market, the major sources of fresh food and fruits for Kampala City. 
 Outspan School Bwaise - A school sponsored by the Northamptonshire Scout Troupe in the United Kingdom
 A branch of Centenary Bank
 The Kampala Northern Bypass Highway, intersects with the Kampala-Gulu Highway in Bwaise.
 The Lubigi wetland has its origins in the swamps in and around Bwaise.

See also

References

External links
 The Slum Dogs’ Life In Bwaise

Neighborhoods of Kampala
Cities in the Great Rift Valley
Kawempe Division